On November 8, 2016, the state of Alaska held its general election.  On the ballot were races for U.S Representative, 10 of 20 seats in the Alaska Senate, all 40 seats in the Alaska House of Representatives.

Federal races

U.S. Representative election

U.S. Senate election

State races

Alaska House of Representatives elections

District 1

District 2

District 3

District 4

District 5

District 6

District 7

District 8

District 9

District 10

District 11

District 12

District 13

District 14

District 15

District 16

District 17

District 18

District 19

District 20

District 21

District 22

District 23

District 24

District 25

District 26

District 27

District 28

District 29

District 30

District 31

District 32

District 33

District 34

District 35

District 36

District 37

District 38

District 39

District 40

Alaska Senate election

District B

District D

District F

District H

District J

District L

District N

District P

District R

District T

References

2016 Alaska elections